Baixo Guandu is a municipality located in the Brazilian state of Espírito Santo that was founded on April 10, 1935 and established as a city on June 8, same year. The city's celebration day is April 10. Its population was 31,132 (2020) and its area is 918 km². The area is most well known for its exports of coffee, especially from the high mountains of the district of Alto Mutum Preto. The main watercourse through the municipality is the Rio Doce river ("Doce" means sweet in Portuguese) whose basin (of 83,500 square kilometers) is composed of 222 municipalities.

History 

Situated in the valley of the Rio Doce, Baixo Guandu occupies a prominent place in the political and socio-economical development of Espírito Santo.

The county was created on April 10, 1935, it was initially colonized by migrants from Cantagalo Rio de Janeiro and European immigrants, especially from Italy and Germany.

The history of Baixo Guandu is directly linked to the pioneering spirit that marked the beginning of the 20th century in the valley of Rio Doce. The rails of the first train arrived in 1907 and the economic activities were intensified. The abundant wood was removed and taken by train to the capital.

According to the testimony of bandeirantes and travelers who have visited the lower Rio Doce since the second half of the 20th century by the middle of last century, the Indians Botocudos native sons and daughters were masters of the region between Rio Doce and the River São Mateus.

The first penetration in the territory of the Baixo Guandu, the former jurisdiction of the municipality of Colatina occurred in 1875, when the major José Vieira de Carvalho Milagres, veteran Paraguayan War reaches the confluence of the Rio Doce river Guandu and there down the core leading to the city.

The colonization of the region, initiated by major Milagres, had his base-grounded in the work of European immigrants of various origins, located in the colonial core of Afonso Pena, today Ibituba.

The foreign colonists settled in the valley of the guandu and the other Ribeirão do Lage. On both sides, there are still today the hallmarks of the European heritage in the region.

The Italians came in Baixo Guandu in 1866 by the initiative of Mr. Francisco Vieira de Carvalho Milagres. A Província do Espírito Santo of June 2, 1866, reported that Mr. Milagres written to his friend Guilherme Frederico, announcing the departure of Genoa, with forty contractors. Days later, came, in fact, from Rio de Janeiro, forty Italians, for their lands in the Rio Doce (June 5, 1866).

The farmer and settler Francisco Vieira de Carvalho Milagres returned to Europe in 1894, in order to bring more workers to his land. The immigrants arrived in the Matteo Bruzzo, as the news of the State of the Espirito Santo of December 8 of the same year and, on 10, went to Rio Doce, and from there, took their destination, where even today, there are their descendants.

As if it had been the desire to repair the abolition of the District of Baixo Guandu, President Henrique da Silva Coutinho created the colony of 1905, including this area is not legitimate Baixo Guandu, to the limits with the municipality of Afonso Cláudio and Minas Gerais. Divided and donated a portion of the batch, they were sold to Italian, French, German, and Spanish settlers them crowded.

The farmer Francisco da Cunha Ramaldes, born in 1861, son of José da Cunha Ramaldes and Balbina Maria de Jesus, from Lajinha do Chalé, State of Minas Gerais, establishes in 1910 in the mountain region of Alto Mutum Preto where he initiates a very lucrative coffee plantation.

Baixo Guandu was the first Brazilian city to receive water treated with fluoride in 1953 in order to reduce the incidence of caries, especially among children.

In 1974, was inaugurated in the city's largest hydroelectric plant in the state, providing power to the Espírito Santo and Minas Gerais. The reservoir, with the use of the waters of the Rio Doce, reaches the volume  of 39,500,000 meters cubic. The dam of reinforced concrete measures 45 meters high and 539 meters wide.

Climate

Temperature:
Annual average: 30 °C
Annual maximum average: 40 °C
Annual minimum average: 20 °C

Average annual rainfall index:  1,500mm

Transportation

Baixo Guandu is served by the Vitória a Minas railroad, which is a 905 km railroad, which is used to transport iron from the Iron Quadrangle in Minas Gerais to the Port of Tubarão in the state of Espírito Santo. This railroad also carried 1.1 million passengers in 2006.

Distances from major centers:
Vitória – 186 km
Belo Horizonte – 499 km
Rio de Janeiro - 576 km
São Paulo - 976 km
Brasília - 1,181 km

Districts
Baixo Guandu (sede)
Alto Mutum Preto
Ibituba
km 14 do Mutum
Vila Nova do Bananal

References

External links
Baixo Guandu Map
Consórcio Rio Guandu (Portuguese)
Family Cunha Ramaldes (Portuguese)
Photos of Baixo Guandu by Marcio A. Anjos

Municipalities in Espírito Santo